Jean-Paul Bacquet (born 11 March 1949 in Saint-Mandé, Val-de-Marne) is a member of the National Assembly of France and represents the Puy-de-Dôme department. He is a member of the Socialist Party (Parti Socialiste) and works in association with the SRC parliamentary group.

References

1949 births
Living people
People from Saint-Mandé
Socialist Party (France) politicians
Deputies of the 12th National Assembly of the French Fifth Republic
Deputies of the 13th National Assembly of the French Fifth Republic
Deputies of the 14th National Assembly of the French Fifth Republic